The  was an infantry division of the Imperial Japanese Army. It was formed on 1 May 1943 at Beijing, simultaneously with the 62nd division as a security (type C) division. The nucleus for the formation was the part of the 6th and 15th independent mixed brigades. As a security division, it lacked an artillery regiment. The men of the division were drafted from the Utsunomiya mobilization district. The division was initially assigned to the 1st army.

Action
Upon formation, the 63rd division was sent to Baoding to perform a garrison duties.

From 19 May 1944, the 63rd division has also participated in the Operation Ichi-Go, attacking Luoyang together with the 9th independent infantry brigade without much success until being rescued by the rest of the 12th army.

In June 1945, the 63rd division was relieved from the front line duty and sent to Tongliao. It fought in Soviet invasion of Manchuria, ending up in eastern Mukden by the time the fighting ceased 2 September 1945 without any formal treaty.

The division personnel was mostly taken prisoner to the Soviet Union, and was confined to labour camps in Mukden, Irkutsk, Russian Turkestan and other places. Although prisoners have started to return in November 1945, some soldiers have remained in captivity, with last of them dead in 1954.

See also
 List of Japanese Infantry Divisions

Notes
This article incorporates material from Japanese Wikipedia page 第63師団 (日本軍), accessed 13 June 2016

Reference and further reading

 Madej, W. Victor. Japanese Armed Forces Order of Battle, 1937-1945 [2 vols]
Allentown, PA: 1981

Japanese World War II divisions
Infantry divisions of Japan
Military units and formations established in 1943
Military units and formations disestablished in 1945
1943 establishments in Japan
1945 disestablishments in Japan